Iris Donnelly Garrison was a fictional character in the American soap opera, Love is a Many Splendored Thing. She was played, most notably, by actresses Leslie Charleson and Bibi Besch. As the first Iris, Leslie Charleson was a member of the original cast of Love Is a Many Splendored Thing.

Older and Loyal
Iris is the daughter of widowed pathologist, Dr. Will Donnelly (Judson Laire), and is the sister of former nun, Laura Donnelly. She is known mostly for her loyalty and unqualified support for her family. She was engaged to Mark Elliott and had known him most of his life. However, his snobbish and overly opportunistic mother, Helen, had no liking for Iris, and pushed him to pursue a relationship with her sister, Laura. Iris stepped back and allowed Laura to marry Mark. Ironically, after Phil Elliott's death, Helen would later marry Iris' older brother, Tom Donnelly (Albert Stratton), a member of the San Francisco police department, after his divorce from his first wife, Martha, alias Julie Richards (Beverlee McKinsey).

Some time later, Iris found love on her own, with a man named Spencer Garrison (Edward Power). His shrewish ex-wife Nancy (Susan Browning), refused to give up her claim on him, as he was a politician, and despite her conniving ways, lost him. During a tryst with Spencer, Iris lost her sight when the plane they were on crashed. Eventually, they had a son named William Alex Garrison, who had been once kidnapped by Laura.

Which really caused a lot of trouble, since Mark, who had mistaken Iris for Laura, had sex with her. The whole situation was ironed out, even though Laura was very angry with her sister for some time. Eventually, Laura realized that Iris wasn't totally to blame, since Iris had been blinded and couldn't see anything, and Mark had mistaken Iris for Laura. Besides, Iris had kept on Mark to make his marriage to her sister work, which helped make Laura feel more secure. Iris and Spencer married after the whole mess was straightened out, and she had regained her sight.

During the mistaken tryst with Mark, Iris discovered she was pregnant. She eventually gave birth to a daughter, Maggie. Laura attempted to steal custody of the girl from her sister, trying to declare her as unfit, but ultimately rescinded the suit, since Iris had been so loyal to her. Laura and Mark remained married, mainly thanks to Iris sticking up for her sister's marriage, and the Elliotts adopted a child, while Maggie remained with Iris and her husband, Spence.

Naturally, Iris, Laura and their brother, Tom, were pleased to no end when their long-widowed father found romance with and then married Lily Chernak (Diana Douglas), who had a daughter that worked with Will, Dr. Betsy Chernak Taylor.

Garrison, Iris Donnelly